The 2020 United States Senate election in Kansas was held on November 3, 2020, to elect a member of the United States Senate to represent the State of Kansas, concurrently with the 2020 U.S. presidential election, as well as other elections to the United States Senate, elections to the United States House of Representatives and various state and local elections.

On January 4, 2019, incumbent Republican Senator Pat Roberts announced he would not run for a fifth term. Candidates had until June 1, 2020 to file to run for the open seat or to drop out if they already filed. The U.S. Senate primaries were held on August 4, 2020. Republican U.S. Representative Roger Marshall was considered a narrow favorite based on polling, but he won by around 11 points, a larger margin than most experts predicted. However, this was the first senate election since 1978 that a Democrat won Shawnee County and the first senate election since 1974 that a Democrat won Riley County, both counties that Biden flipped in the concurrent presidential election.

Republican primary

Candidates

Nominee
Roger Marshall, incumbent U.S. representative for Kansas's 1st congressional district

Eliminated in primary
Kris Kobach, former Secretary of State of Kansas and Republican nominee for Governor of Kansas in 2018
Bob Hamilton, businessman
Lance Berland
John L. Berman, engineer
Derek Ellis, quality assurance technician
Dave Lindstrom, board chairman for the Kansas Turnpike Authority, former Kansas City Chiefs player, Republican nominee for lieutenant governor of Kansas in 2002
Brian Matlock, economics graduate student
John Miller
Steve Roberts, member of the Kansas Board of Education
Gabriel Mark Robles

Withdrawn
Jake LaTurner, Kansas State Treasurer (running for U.S. House in District 2)
Bryan Pruitt, conservative commentator
Susan Wagle, President of the Kansas Senate

Declined
Alan Cobb, president of the Kansas Chamber of Commerce
Jeff Colyer, former governor of Kansas and lieutenant governor of Kansas (endorsed Roger Marshall)
Ron Estes, incumbent U.S. representative for Kansas's 4th congressional district and former Kansas State Treasurer (running for reelection)
Wink Hartman, oilman and restaurant owner, nominee for lieutenant governor of Kansas in 2018
Ajit Pai, chairman of the Federal Communications Commission
Mike Pompeo, United States Secretary of State, former director of the Central Intelligence Agency, and former U.S. representative for Kansas's 4th congressional district
Pat Roberts, incumbent U.S. senator (endorsed Roger Marshall)
Matt Schlapp, incumbent chairman of the American Conservative Union and former director of the Office of Political Affairs
Derek Schmidt, Kansas Attorney General
Scott Schwab, Kansas Secretary of State

Primary debate
In a live-streamed debate on May 22, 2020, in a ballroom devoid of spectators due to the COVID-19 pandemic, all five major candidates praised president Donald Trump. Kobach took on his opponents who all agreed that he could not win the general election against presumptive Democratic nominee, Bollier. Marshall said, "We cannot afford to send a failed candidate back this fall who will lose to Barbara Bollier and hand the Senate majority over to Chuck Schumer." "Instead, we need to send a tried and trusted friend of President Trump." Referring to Marshall, Kobach replied, "Do you want a go-along-to-get-along kind of senator, a gutless wonder who never takes a stand, or, do you want someone who poses a threat?" Hamilton said voters didn't have to choose between Kobach, who couldn't win, and a moderate Marshall, in whose behest the state party leaders had urged Senator Wagle and Lindstrom, to drop out of the race. Objecting to the party pressure, Lindstrom characterized his opponents as "shortsighted, self-serving ... career politicians who are divisive, controversial," and, "have a record of losing elections." Wagle touted her own candidacy, saying, "It's very, very important that we send a leader to the U.S. Senate who is articulate, who is persuasive, who other people respect. ... I'm the one who's already debated Barbara Bollier. ... I win on the Senate floor. I've beat (sic) her numerous times ... the conservative voice that can beat that liberal voice in the U.S. Senate," she said. In response to a claim that he would not prioritize the issue of agriculture, Marshall said, "Fake news and another lie by Kris Kobach."

Endorsements

Polling

with only Kris Kobach and Roger Marshall

with only Bob Hamilton, Kris Kobach and Roger Marshall

with Mike Pompeo and Susan Wagle

with only Kris Kobach and Mike Pompeo

Results

Democratic primary

Candidates

Nominee
 Barbara Bollier, physician and state senator

Eliminated in primary
 Robert Tillman, Kansas National Guard veteran and perennial candidate

Withdrawn
 Elliot Adams, database developer
Nancy Boyda, former U.S. Representative from Kansas's 2nd congressional district (endorsed Bollier)
Corbie Crow, certified public accountant
Barry Grissom, former United States Attorney for the District of Kansas (endorsed Bollier)
Usha Reddi, mayor of Manhattan
Adam Smith

Declined
Paul Davis, former minority leader of the Kansas House of Representatives, nominee for governor in 2014 and KS-02 in 2018
Kathleen Sebelius, former Secretary of Health and Human Services, former Governor of Kansas, and former Kansas Insurance Commissioner
Sarah Smarsh, author
Josh Svaty, former Kansas Secretary of Agriculture, former state representative, and candidate for Governor of Kansas in 2018
Brent Welder, candidate for Kansas's 3rd congressional district in 2018

Endorsements

Results

Other candidates

Libertarian Party

Nominee
 Jason Buckley, U.S. Navy veteran

Independents

Withdrawn
 Paul Tuten

General election

Endorsements

Predictions

Polling
Graphical summary

Bob Hamilton vs. Barbara Bollier

Kris Kobach vs. Barbara Bollier

Kris Kobach vs. Barry Grissom

Generic Republican vs. Generic Democrat

Results 

On the night of the election, Roger Marshall was announced as the winner of the Senate race.

Notes

Partisan clients

See also

 2020 Kansas elections
 List of United States senators from Kansas

References

Further reading

External links
 
 
  (State affiliate of the U.S. League of Women Voters)
 

Official campaign websites
 Barbara Bollier (D) for Senate 
 Jason Buckley (L) for Senate 
 Roger Marshall (R) for Senate

2020
Kansas
United States Senate
Open seats in the 2020 United States Senate elections